Bette M. Cato (May 9, 1924 – January 18, 1996) was an American politician who served in the Alaska House of Representatives from 1981 to 1989. She was a member of the Democratic Party.

Early life and career
Cato was born in Irby, Washington, in 1924. She attended Eastern Washington College and earned a Bachelor of Arts in education. She settled in Alaska in 1957, working as a teacher in Kenai.

After moving to Valdez she became the president of the Valdez American Federation of Teachers and later served as the Vice President of AFT Alaska.

Political career
Cato was elected to the Alaska House of Representatives in 1980. In June 1981, Cato helped elevate Republican legislator Joe L. Hayes to the House speakership.

By 1985, Cato was the House Transportation Committee chair.

Following a diagnosis of diverticulitis in 1989, Cato declared her intention to resign in October of that year. Her resignation took effect on December 31, 1989, and governor Steve Cowper appointed Eugene G. Kubina to Cato's seat.

Personal life
Cato's husband Jack predeceased her. The couple had one son. Bette Cato died in on January 18, 1996, of cancer complications, at Phoenix Memorial Hospital.

References

External links
 Bette Cato at 100 Years of Alaska's Legislature

1924 births
Democratic Party members of the Alaska House of Representatives
Women state legislators in Alaska
20th-century American politicians
20th-century American women politicians
People from Lincoln County, Washington
Schoolteachers from Alaska
American women educators
Eastern Washington University alumni
People from Valdez, Alaska
Deaths from cancer in Arizona
1996 deaths